Svenja Huber (born 23 October 1985) is a German handball player for Borussia Dortmund and the German national team.

References

1985 births
Living people
German female handball players
Sportspeople from Mannheim